Lachnoptera ayresii, the eastern blotched leopard, is a butterfly of the family Nymphalidae. It is found in Afromontane and riverine forest from Port St. Johns in the Eastern Cape and then along the escarpment to the midlands of KwaZulu-Natal, Eswatini, Mpumalanga and the Wolkberg in Limpopo, north to Zimbabwe and Mozambique.

The wingspan is 45–52 mm for males and 50–56 mm for females. Adults are on wing year round with a peak in late summer and autumn, from January to June.

The larvae feed on Rawsonia lucida and Vismia species.

References

Vagrantini
Butterflies described in 1879
Butterflies of Africa
Taxa named by Roland Trimen